John Charles Nugent (April 6, 1868 – April 21, 1947), was an American actor, director, and screenwriter. A veteran stage performer, he appeared in 20 films between 1929 and 1943.

Early life
Nugent was born in Niles, Ohio, and attended Reeves University.

Career 
By 1900, Nugent was active in vaudeville.

Nugent's Broadway debut came in the comedy Kempy (1922), which he wrote. Kempy was considered a success. Dorothy Parker enthusiastically reviewed Kempy in her theater column in Ainslee's Magazine, saying, "People strayed into the Belmont Theatre on the opening night with an air of, 'I may stick it out for an act or so, but I'm glad of the chance to get to bed early.' And then Kempy turned out to be one of the nicest little comedies they ever saw in their lives."

From 1922 until 1947, Nugent directed and wrote plays, occasionally acting in some of them.

Personal life 
He was the father of actor, writer and producer Elliott Nugent, with whom he sometimes wrote or acted, and actress Ruth Elizabeth Nugent. Nugent was also the father-in-law of actor Alan Bunce of Ethel and Albert fame.

Nugent died in New York City.

Filmography

References

External links

1868 births
1947 deaths
Male actors from Ohio
People from Niles, Ohio
American male screenwriters
American male film actors
American male silent film actors
20th-century American male actors
Screenwriters from Ohio
20th-century American male writers
20th-century American screenwriters